Alençon is a railway station in Alençon, Normandy, France. The station opened on 15 March 1856 and is located on the Le Mans–Mézidon railway line. The station is served by TER (local) services operated by SNCF.

Train services
The following services currently call at Alençon:
local services (TER Normandie) Caen - Alençon - Le Mans

References

External links
 

Railway stations in Orne
Railway stations in France opened in 1856